Historia Lettica is one of the oldest historical books about Latvia, Latvian mythology and Latvian language. It was written by Lutheran priest Paul Einhorn in the German language and published in 1649.

History books about Latvia
1649 books
Königsberg
Latvian language